The canton of Gisors is an administrative division of the Eure department, northern France. Its borders were modified at the French canton reorganisation which came into effect in March 2015. Its seat is in Gisors.

It consists of the following communes:

Amécourt
Authevernes
Bazincourt-sur-Epte
Bernouville
Bézu-Saint-Éloi
Chauvincourt-Provemont
Coudray
Dangu
Doudeauville-en-Vexin
Étrépagny
Farceaux
Gamaches-en-Vexin
Gisors
Guerny
Hacqueville
Hébécourt
Heudicourt
Longchamps
Morgny
Mouflaines
Neaufles-Saint-Martin
La Neuve-Grange
Nojeon-en-Vexin
Noyers
Puchay
Richeville
Saint-Denis-le-Ferment
Sainte-Marie-de-Vatimesnil
Sancourt
Saussay-la-Campagne
Le Thil
Les Thilliers-en-Vexin
Vesly
Villers-en-Vexin

References

Cantons of Eure